John Whitworth (11 December 1945 - 20 April 2019) was a British poet. Born in India in 1945, he began writing poetry at Merton College, Oxford. He went on to win numerous prizes and publish in many highly regarded venues. He published twelve books: ten collections of his own work, an anthology of which he was the editor, and a textbook on writing poetry.

Life
Whitworth was born in India in 1945. He graduated from Merton College, Oxford. His work appeared in Poetry Review, The Times Literary Supplement, London Magazine, The Spectator, Quadrant, New Poetry,  The Flea, Chimaera, HyperTexts, Light, Qualm, and Shit Creek Review. He taught a master class at University of Kent. He was a judge for the 9th Poetry on the Lake Competition, 2009.
He read at Lamar University.
He read at the 9th annual Sarah Lawrence College Poetry Festival 2012.

He was married to Doreen Roberts, who taught at the University of Kent; they had two daughters, Ellie and Katie.

Awards
 1988 Cholmondeley Award
 2004 The Silver Wyvern, Poetry on the Lake
 2009 Eleanor Room Poetry Award Lamar University
 2011 Literary Review £5000 Poetry Prize

Bibliography

Poetry
Collections

Anthologies

List of poems

Non-fiction

References

External links
 About John Whitworth at Poetry Archive
 
 
 
 
 
John Whitworth Poems in Qualm
John Whitworth 2011 Poems in Qualm

1945 births
2019 deaths
British poets
British male poets
Alumni of Merton College, Oxford
Quadrant (magazine) people